Limestone Township may refer to:

 Limestone Township, Franklin County, Arkansas, in Franklin County, Arkansas
 Limestone Township, Kankakee County, Illinois
 Limestone Township, Peoria County, Illinois
 Limestone Township, Jewell County, Kansas
 Limestone Township, Alger County, Michigan
 Limestone Township, Lincoln County, Minnesota
 Limestone Township, Buncombe County, North Carolina, in Buncombe County, North Carolina
 Limestone Township, Duplin County, North Carolina, in Duplin County, North Carolina
 Limestone Township, Clarion County, Pennsylvania
 Limestone Township, Lycoming County, Pennsylvania
 Limestone Township, Montour County, Pennsylvania
 Limestone Township, Union County, Pennsylvania
 Limestone Township, Warren County, Pennsylvania

Township name disambiguation pages